Nannaku Prematho is a 2016 Indian Telugu-language action thriller film written and directed by Sukumar and produced by B. V. S. N. Prasad under Sri Venkateswara Cine Chitra, Bhogavalli Bapineedu and Reliance Entertainment. The film, set in London, stars N. T. Rama Rao Jr., Jagapathi Babu, Rajendra Prasad and Rakul Preet Singh. Nannaku Prematho marks the 25th film of Rama Rao Jr. as an actor.

Devi Sri Prasad has composed the film's music and background score. The cinematography was provided by Vijay C Chakravarthy, and Naveen Nooli edited the film. Principal photography commenced in August 2015. The audio launch of this film was held on 27 December 2015. The film was released worldwide on 13 January 2016. The film was remade in Bengali as Baazi (2021).

Plot
Abhiram is the youngest son of London-based businessman Subrahmanyam, who quits his job and starts his own company, K.M.C Pipes and Canals and he completes his company's first project in Spain. He learns that his father is suffering from pancreatic cancer and has roughly a month or more to live. Subrahmanyam reveals his name as Ramesh Chandra Prasad, who was once London's richest entrepreneur, who lost all his wealth because of a cunning man, Krishna Murthy Kautilya, who made his worldwide business empire cheating Ramesh Chandra. He was then forced to change his name to Subrahmanyam and got rich again after years of work. Subrahmanyam requests his three sons to take revenge on his behalf. 

Subramanyam's first son lies to him that he has filed a lawsuit against Krishna Murthy to pacify him, but Abhiram ends up taking matters into his own hands. He sets 30 days to bring down Krishna Murthy and hires three youngsters who are shown to love their fathers dearly. He targets Krishnamurty's daughter Divyanka aka Divya to reach him. Divya reappropriates Abhiram's feelings after saving her from kidnapping and spending every last penny of their family bank balance to buy her a  worth of painting. Abhiram meets Krishnamurty at Divya's birthday party, but Krishna Murthy turns out to be aware of Abhiram's intentions. Subrahmanyam gets admitted to the hospital as his condition turns critical. 

Abhiram's brothers break up with him after they 
come to know that Abhiram wasted their property on the painting. Krishna Murthy plants a bug in Abhiram's lair, because of which he discovers their plans, and Divya too learns of Abhiraam's intentions and breaks up with him. Krishna Murthy had grabbed the People Oil and Natural Gas project, which is one of the largest oil and gas bases in Europe belonging to a businessman Kapil Sinha in Spain, to where he goes with Divya. Abhiram follows them with his group but gets kidnapped by Divya's henchman. She does so as she wants to find his plans of ruining her father. Abhiram regains Divya's love and also gets her to meet her mother in prison, whom she had not met since she was 4 years old, and revealed her mysterious dream. 

Krishnamurthy had planted drugs in their bag during one of their travels, but the airport security find the bag with Divya's mother when Krishna Murthy and Divya were in the washroom. Krishna Murthy leaves his wife to save himself and his daughter. Divya begins to loathe Krishna Murthy. Meanwhile, it turns out that the painting gifted to Krishna Murthy had a camera in it and that Abhiraam was also aware of Krishna Murthy's plans. Abhiram accesses Krishna Murthy's bank number, transferring  to his family account. 

It is also revealed that the People Oil and Natural Gas land that Krishna Murthy grabbed was no real gas land, and the gas there was given by tunnels planted by Abhiram's KMC company: Krishna Murthy Mosam Chese company (lit. 'Cheating Krishna Murthy Company'). Kapil is revealed to be Satpal Singh, Subrahmanyam's ex-adviser and best friend, who had been supporting Abhiram since the beginning. Krishna Murthy becomes of the same condition as Ramesh Chandra Prasad and absconds and changes his identity to Subrahmanyam. Divya and her mother move in with Abhiram's family, but sadly, Ramesh Chandra succumbs to his disease and dies. Abhiram still does not cry as he thinks that his father will go the day he cries.

Cast

 N. T. Rama Rao Jr. as Abhiram 
 Jagapathi Babu as Krishna Murthy Kautilya
 Rajendra Prasad as Ramesh Chandra Prasad alias Subrahmanyam
 Rakul Preet Singh as Divyanka  "Divya" Krishnamurthy
 Rajiv Kanakala as Vamsi, Abhiram's elder brother
 Srinivas Avasarala as Abhiram's second elder brother
 Ashish Vidyarthi as Satpal Singh / Kapil Sinha
 Madhoo as Divya's mother
 Thagubothu Ramesh as Abhiram's assistant
 Noel Sean as Noel
 Uppada Parvateesam as Abhiram's assistant
 Giridhar as Giri, Krishna Murthy's assistant
 Amit Tiwari as JD, Krishna Murthy's PA
 Naveen Neni as Abhiram's assistant 
 Vennela Kishore as the guy who sells the painting to Abhiram

Production

Development
In April 2015, Sukumar came up with the story of the film. In July 2015, the film's shooting had started, and by December, the post-production was done. The film's first look poster had released on 17 September 2015 on the occasion of Vinayaka Chavithi. The film's teaser was released on 21 October 2015 on the occasion of the Vijayadasami (Dasara) festival. The teaser created a record of being the most liked and viewed Telugu film teaser at the time. Another poster was released as a Deepavali Special, featuring a dancing still of Jr. NTR.

Casting
Rakul Preet Singh was selected to play the female lead role opposite Jr. NTR. Rajendra Prasad plays the role of Jr. NTR's father in this film. Initially, it was rumoured that Jagapati Babu and NTR's own father Nandamuri Harikrishna were approached to play NTR's father role in the movie, but due to some reasons, both had refused. Jagapati Babu instead played the main negative role.

Filming
Principal photography commenced in the United Kingdom. It was a 40-day schedule where all the actors took part. The MRMC Bolt High Speed Cinebot, the fastest camera robot in the world, which is used to obtain shots of extremely high speed objects with absolute detail, was used in some crucial scenes during the UK schedule. After wrapping up the UK schedule, the team returned to Hyderabad. While Sukumar was directing Nannaku Prematho, he was simultaneously producing the movie Kumari 21F, so he took a break because Kumari 21F was nearing its release date. The Nannaku Prematho team then finished some part of the title song shoot in Hyderabad near Toopran. Afterwards, the team shifted to Spain for the final schedule of the film. The movie team wrapped up its Spain schedule by late-November 2015. Finally, the team shifted back to Hyderabad to shoot a final scene sequence. On 30 December 2015,  the filmmakers announced that the film's shooting was wrapped.

Soundtrack

Music of this film was composed by Devi Sri Prasad, who collaborated for the fifth time with both Jr. NTR and Sukumar. The audio rights were bought by Junglee Music.

After the death of Satyamurthy, Prasad's father and former film screenplay and story writer, the album was dedicated to the former in an audio launch ceremony on 27 December 2015.

For the fifth time in his career, Jr. NTR lent his vocals for a jazz-style number called Follow Follow.

Behindwoods.com gave the soundtrack 4 out of 5 stars, stating that " Nannaku Prematho is a fun album with ample dose of trendy as well as mass numbers with a tinge of experimentation. All in all, it is another winner in the combo of Sukumar- DSP!". Another film news website, Indiaglitz.com, also rated the album 3 out of 5 stars and stated that "Devi Sri Prasad, Sukumar and NTR are an exciting combination. This album brings out this uniqueness in its choice of lyrics.  It is not vintage DSP at his best. All that you can expect from this album is good dose of energy and verve, DSP-style, NTR-style". 123telugu.com quoted this album as a "different album from the crazy combo" and finally stated that "On the whole, the audio of Nannaku Prematho is quite different from Devi Sri Prasad’s regular albums. Even though the tunes are not in the regular commercial format, they are elevated well by some meaningful and catchy lyrics."

Distribution
The overseas theatrical distribution rights were acquired by CineGalaxy Inc. for 6.2 crores. RansiTech Solutions Ltd. bagged the UK distribution rights in late October 2015 "Reliance" Raghu of Shantha Pictures acquired the Ceded distribution Rights for 7.2 crores. This is the highest price offered to any movie in this region after Baahubali: The Beginning, which was bought for 13 crores.

Box office
Nannaku Prematho grossed  worldwide in the first nine days. By the end of its second week had grossed  .

Critical reception
Times of India rated the film 3.5/5, and wrote, "(The flaws) should be no reason to miss this film because Nannaku Prematho is like a delectable serving of dessert with a hint of tang. The flavour may seem out of place initially because you aren’t used to it. But if you try it with an open mind, you’d probably savour it."

Idlebrain.com gave it 3.25/5 and wrote, "The underlying emotion of father-son gets fused in the complex screenplay and the mind games between hero and villain. It’s a great effort by Sukumar in terms of screenplay and logic. On a whole, Nannaku Prematho is a commendable and extraordinary concept thriller made on grand scale."

Business Standard stated that NTR, particularly, needs to be lauded for not playing to the gallery and choosing to work with a director who isn't afraid to go against the tide. This is precisely why you want to appreciate Sukumar, who, by all means, could have safely made a regular commercial potboiler. But he didn't, and that's what differentiates him from other filmmakers as he made this film an action thriller with memorable twists. "Nannaku Prematho", on the whole, isn't a bad film as it was made even more sensibly.

Accolades

References

External links
 
  

2016 films
Films scored by Devi Sri Prasad
Films directed by Sukumar
Films set in London
Films shot in London
2010s Telugu-language films
2010s business films
Trading films
Films about financial crises
Indian action thriller films
2010s legal drama films
Indian legal films
2016 action drama films
Indian action drama films
Reliance Entertainment films
Indian business films
2016 action thriller films
Telugu films remade in other languages